Eeli Tolvanen (born 22 April 1999) is a Finnish professional ice hockey forward who is currently playing for the Seattle Kraken of the National Hockey League (NHL). Tolvanen was selected by the Nashville Predators in the first round, 30th overall, in the 2017 NHL Entry Draft. He was born in Vihti, Finland, but grew up in Huhmari, Finland.

Playing career
Tolvanen first played in his native Finland within the junior program of the Espoo Blues. Upon the 2015–16 season, Tolvanen opted to pursue a North American development in playing junior hockey for Sioux City Musketeers of the United States Hockey League. He later committed to play collegiate hockey with Boston College on 13 June 2016.

Following a standout 2016–17 season with the Musketeers, he was selected with the 30th pick in the first round by the Nashville Predators in the 2017 NHL Draft. Tolvanen's collegiate aspirations were closed after his application was rejected by the Boston College admissions due to an issue with his high school course credits on 22 June 2017.

On 5 July 2017, Tolvanen started his professional career in agreeing to an optional two-year contract with the Finnish-based Jokerit of the KHL.

On 23 August 2017, Tolvanen scored his first career KHL hat trick in his season debut against HC Dinamo Minsk, giving him the youngest hat trick in KHL history at 18 years 123 days. Tolvanen scored his second career KHL hat trick on 25 September 2017 in his eleventh game of the KHL season against HC Vityaz. He was voted in by fans to play in the 2018 KHL All-Star Game.

Tolvanen arrived in Nashville and signed a three-year entry-level contract with the Nashville Predators of the NHL on 29 March 2018. He made his NHL debut on 31 March 2018 in a 7–4 loss to the Buffalo Sabres. On 1 December 2018, Tolvanen scored his first career NHL goal against Cam Ward of the Chicago Blackhawks.

After attending the Predators training camp, Tolvanen was reassigned to the Milwaukee Admirals in the American Hockey League to begin the 2019–20 season.

Approaching the final season of his entry-level contract on 24 August 2020, Tolvanen returned to original club, Jokerit of the KHL, on loan until the commencement of the delayed 2020–21 North American season. He made 25 further appearances for Jokerit, posting 5 goals and 13 points, before returning to North America on 15 December 2020.

In the midst of his sixth year within the Predators organization during the  season, Tolvanen having appeared in 13 games and contributing with 4 points was placed on waivers on 11 December 2022. His tenure with the Predators came at an end the following day after he was claimed off waivers by the Seattle Kraken. He scored his first goal for Seattle on 1 January 2023, a power play goal against the New York Islanders.

International play
Tolvanen was selected to represent Team Finland at the 2016 IIHF World U18 Championships where he helped Finland win gold. The following years he played for Team Finland in the 2017 World Junior Ice Hockey Championships and the 2018 World Junior Ice Hockey Championships. Tolvanen was also selected to play for Team Finland at the 2018 Winter Olympics. In his Olympic debut, he recorded four points to help Finland beat Germany 5–2. He ended the tournament with 9 points in 5 games.

Personal life
Tolvanen is the youngest of three brothers, Joona and Atte, who all play hockey. His brother Joona plays in the Finnish Mestis league, while his other brother Atte played for Northern Michigan University.

Career statistics

Regular Season and playoffs

International

Awards and honours

References

External links

1999 births
Living people
Finnish ice hockey right wingers
Jokerit players
Milwaukee Admirals players
Nashville Predators draft picks
Nashville Predators players
National Hockey League first-round draft picks
Ice hockey players at the 2018 Winter Olympics
Olympic ice hockey players of Finland
People from Vihti
Seattle Kraken players
Sioux City Musketeers players
Sportspeople from Uusimaa